The 2021 Dublin Senior Football Championship was the 135th edition of Dublin GAA's premier gaelic football tournament for senior clubs in County Dublin, Ireland. 32 teams participate (16 in Senior 1 and 16 in Senior 2), with the winner of Senior 1 representing Dublin in the Leinster Senior Club Football Championship.

Kilmacud Crokes defeated St Jude's to win the Senior 1 Championship.

St Pat's Donabate won the 2021 I.F.C. and were promoted along with I.F.C. finalists Round Towers Clondalkin to Senior 2. They replaced St Peregrines and Fingal Ravens who were relegated to the 2022 I.F.C.

Cuala won the Senior 2 Championship and were promoted along with finalists Templeogue Synge Street to Senior 1. They replaced St Oliver Plunketts and St Vincents who were relegated to the 2022 SFC2.

Senior 1

Group 1 

Round 1

Round 2

Round 3

Group 2 

Round 1

Round 2

Round 3

Group 3

Round 1

Round 2

Round 3

Group 4 

Round 1

Round 2

Round 3

Quarter-finals

Semi-finals

Final

Relegation play-offs

Senior 2

Group 1 

Round 1

Round 2

Round 3

Group 2 

Round 1

Round 2

Round 3

Group 3

Round 1

Round 2

Round 3

Group 4 

Round 1

Round 2

Round 3

Quarter-finals

Semi-finals

Final

Relegation play-offs

References

External links
Dublin GAA Fixtures & Results

Dublin Senior Football Championship
Dublin Senior Football Championship
Dublin SFC